Anthony J. Fingleton is an Australian former competitive swimmer who won silver medal in 1962 British Empire and Commonwealth Games. He was invited to participate in 1964 Summer Olympics, but instead accepted a scholarship to study at Harvard University, where he swam for the Harvard Crimson swimming team.  He remained in the United States after graduation and became a screenwriter and movie producer, including the 1991 Rik Mayall film, Drop Dead Fred.

In 2003 film director Russell Mulcahy made a biographical film about Tony, called Swimming Upstream, based on his autobiography. Tony Fingleton was played by Jesse Spencer and Harold, his father and chief antagonist, by Geoffrey Rush.

See also
 List of Commonwealth Games medallists in swimming (men)

References

External links

Living people
Australian film producers
Australian screenwriters
Australian male backstroke swimmers
Harvard Crimson men's swimmers
Swimmers at the 1962 British Empire and Commonwealth Games
Commonwealth Games medallists in swimming
Commonwealth Games silver medallists for Australia
Year of birth missing (living people)
Medallists at the 1962 British Empire and Commonwealth Games